Calamospondylus (meaning "quill vertebrae") is a genus of theropod dinosaur. It lived during the Early Cretaceous and its fossils were found on the Isle of Wight in southern England. The type species is C. oweni.

The holotype was collected by William D. Fox in 1865 and Calamospondylus oweni was described anonymously by amateur paleontologist William D. Fox in 1866 on the basis of a sacrum and associated pelvic elements found on the Isle of Wight in the layers of the Wessex Formation. Several authors (e.g. Woodward & Sherborn 1890; Swinton 1936; Steel 1970) regarded Calamospondylus as a nomen nudum for Aristosuchus and therefore based on the same specimen as the Aristosuchus holotype. However, as noted by Naish (2002), size discrepancies between the holotypes of Calamospondylus oweni and Aristosuchus pusillus as well as letters of correspondence between Richard Owen and Reverend William Fox demonstrate that C. oweni is based on a different specimen than Aristosuchus.

More remains have since been found, including fragmentary vertebrae collected by Kai Bailey in 2014 and a tibia also collected by Fox in 1865. Both specimens are on display at the Dinosaur Expeditions, Conservation and Palaeoart Centre near Brighstone, Isle of Wight.

As a possible oviraptorosaurian, Calamospondylus would have been a small, agile, bipedal carnivore. Naish et al.

See also 
 Aristosuchus

References

Prehistoric coelurosaurs
Barremian life
Early Cretaceous dinosaurs of Europe
Cretaceous England
Fossils of England
Fossil taxa described in 1866